Volubilis ("intertwined") is a series of marble sculptures by French sculptor Alfred Boucher (1850–1934), mentor to Camille Claudel and friend of Auguste Rodin.

First exhibited at the Salon in 1896 (probably the example in Musée des beaux-arts de Troyes), Volubilis appeared in several variations on the theme of the female body emerging from a roughly carved surround.

Boucher reworked the idea over many years. It was first explored three years before the 1896 exhibit in his Tete de Diane. The theme continues with Aux Champs exhibited in 1897. The sculptural potency of this format continued to intrigue Boucher, whose later revision in 1912 is entitled La Reve.

The concept of a beautiful creature evolving out of a piece of crudely carved rock is one of exciting contrasts, a kind of Pygmalion process whereby the sculptor's Muse comes alive, the sensuality heightened by the contrast between the unfinished and finished, the severity of the rock against the smoothness of the skin. It is achieved by carving in three-quarter relief, a method exploited by Boucher's contemporary and friend Auguste Rodin, but drawing its inspiration from Michelangelo's unfinished Slaves.

Bibliography
Alfred Boucher, 1850–1934, sculpteur humaniste, Musée Paul Dubois-Alfred Boucher, Nogent-sur-Seine, 27 May to 29 October 2000, (catalogue available with text by Jacques Piette, conservateur du musée municipal Paul Dubois — Alfred Boucher).

1896 sculptures
Marble sculptures
Sculptures in France
Sculpture series